Reidar Sandal (born 24 March 1949 in Vågsøy) is a Norwegian politician for the Labour Party, and was a parliamentary representative for Sogn and Fjordane. He was Minister of Education, Research and Church Affairs 1995-1996 and 1996-1997.

References

1949 births
Living people
Government ministers of Norway
Labour Party (Norway) politicians
Members of the Storting
21st-century Norwegian politicians
People from Vågsøy
Ministers of Education of Norway